These are the singles that reached number one on the Top 100 Singles chart in 1972 as published in Cash Box magazine.

See also
1972 in music
List of Hot 100 number-one singles of 1972 (U.S.)

References
http://members.aol.com/_ht_a/randypny3/cashbox/1972.html
https://web.archive.org/web/20130305035647/http://cashboxmagazine.com/archives/70s_files/1972.html
https://web.archive.org/web/20080101114729/http://musicseek.info/no1hits/1972.htm

1972
1972 record charts
1972 in American music